The 3rd Caucasus Cossack Division was a cavalry division of the Imperial Russian Army during World War I. It was part of the 3rd Caucasus Army Corps.

Organization 
 1st Brigade
 2nd Brigade

Commanders 
 1910–1917: Pavel Helmickij
 1917: Sergei Ivanovich Odintsov

Chiefs of Staff 
 1910–1912: Aseev, Mikhail Vasil'evich
 1912–1915: Sergei Ivanovich Odintsov
 Kosyakov, Victor Antonovich
 1915–1917: Lazarev, Boris Petrovich

Commanders of the 1st Brigade 
 1910–1914: Fisenko, Nikolay Ivanovich
 1915: Marganija, Malahij Kvadzhievich
 1916: Safarbek Malsagov

Commanders of the 2nd Brigade 
 1913–1916: Fyodor Petrovich Filimonov

External links 
 Страница на Regiment.ru

Cavalry divisions of the Russian Empire
Cossack military units and formations